Piotr Antoni Świtalski (born 2 August 1957, in Kutno) is a Polish diplomat; permanent representative of Poland to the Council of Europe (2005–2010) and ambassador of the European Union to Armenia (2015–2019).

Life 
Świtalski has graduated from Faculty of Journalism and Political Science at the University of Warsaw and Moscow State Institute of International Relations (1982). In 1985, he defended his Ph.D. dissertation in history. 

In 1986, he joined the Ministry of Foreign Affairs of Poland. He was head of the unit at the Department of European Institutions. From 1990 to 1993 he was First Secretary and Councillor at the Permanent Mission of the Republic of Poland to the United Nations Office and the International Organizations in Vienna. For next three years he held the post of department director at the OSCE Secretary. He returned to the MFA, being responsible mostly for multilateral relations. Between 1999 and 2002 he was serving at the Poland embassy in Nairobi as permanent representative to UNEP and UN-Habitat. Following his directoral post at the MFA Department of Foreign Policy Planning (2002–2005), on 11 January 2005 he was nominated Undersecretary of State at the Ministry of Foreign Affairs. On 20 September 2005 he became permanent representative of Poland to the Council of Europe in Strasbourg. Ending his term on 1 September 2010, he became director for policy planning at the Council of Europe Secretary. In 2014, he returned to the MFA, Warsaw. He was director of Asia and Pacific Department. From September 2015 to 2019 he was serving as a European Union ambassador to Armenia.

Besides Polish, Świtalski speaks English, Russian, German, and French. He is married, with two children.

Works 

 Гражданин и мировая политика. Цикл лекций, Wyd. Shkola grazhdanskogo prosveshchenya, Riga, 2022, ISBN 978-9934-9133-0-3
 Europe and the Spectre of Post-Growth Society, Strasburg: Council of Europe, 2014, .
 Emocje, interesy, wartości. Przemiany paradygmatów polityki międzynarodowej, Toruń: Wydawnictwo Adam Marszałek, 2013, .
 Droga do Pangei: polityka międzynarodowa czasu „globalizacyjnej konwergencji”, Toruń: Wydawnictwo Adam Marszałek, 2011, .
 Niecierpliwość świata. Uwagi o polityce międzynarodowej czasu globalizacji, Warszawa: Wydawnictwo Scholar, 2008, .
 OBWE w systemie bezpieczeństwa europejskiego: szanse i ograniczenia, Warszawa: Instytut Spraw Publicznych, 1997, .

References 

1957 births
Ambassadors of the European Union to Armenia
Living people
Moscow State Institute of International Relations alumni
People from Kutno
Permanent Representatives of Poland to the Council of Europe
Polish officials of the European Union
University of Warsaw alumni